Cathal Mannion (born 22 October 1994) is an Irish hurler who plays for Galway Senior Championship club Ahascragh-Fohenagh and at inter-county level with the Galway senior hurling team. He usually lines out as a left corner-forward.

Playing career

Ahascragh-Fohenagh
Mannion joined the Ahascragh-Fohenagh club at a young age and played in all grades at juvenile and underage levels before eventually joining the club's top adult team.

On 21 October 2016, Mannion scored a goal when Ahascragh-Fohenagh defeated Ballinderreen by 2-15 to 0-08 to win the Galway Intermediate Championship. He later scored 2-11 when Ahascragh-Fohenagh won the Connacht Championship on 14 November following a 2-20 to 0-13 defeat of Ballyhaunis in the final. On 18 February 2017, Mannion top scored for Ahascragh-Fohenagh with five points when they suffered a 2-15 to 0-06 defeat by Carrickshock in the All-Ireland final.

Galway

Minor and under-21
Mannion first lined out for Galway as a member of the minor team during the 2011 All-Ireland Championship. He won an All-Ireland medal as a non-playing substitute on 4 September following Galway's 1-21 to 1-12 defeat of Dublin in the final.

On 28 July 2012, Mannion made his first appearance for the Galway minor team. He scored two points from midfield in a 4-20 to 2-11 defeat of Wexford in the All-Ireland quarter-final.

Mannion was drafted onto the Galway under-21 team for the 2013 All-Ireland Championship. He made his first appearance for the team on 24 August and scored three points from full-forward in a 1-16 to 0-07 defeat by Clare. His three-year tenure with the under-21 team ended without success.

Senior
Mannion was still eligible for the under-21 grade when he was selected for the Galway senior team. He made his first appearance for the team on 16 February 2014 and scored four points from right corner-forward in a 0-28 to 1-12 defeat of Dublin in the National League. Mannion was also included on Galway's starting fifteen for the Leinster Championship. He made his debut on 1 June in a 1-22 to 0-23 defeat of Laois.

On 5 July 2015, Mannion lined out in his first Leinster final. He scored a point from right corner-forward in the 1-23 to 2-17 defeat by Kilkenny. Mannion was switched to left corner-forward for the All-Ireland final against Kilkenny on 6 September. He was held scoreless in the 1-22 to 1-18 defeat. Mannion ended the season by receiving an All-Star award.

On 3 July 2016, Mannion scored five points in Galway's 1-26 to 0-22 defeat by Kilkenny in the Leinster final.

Mannion claimed his first silverware with the Galway senior team on 22 April 2017. He scored 1-01 when Galway won the National League title after a 3-21 to 0-14 defeat of Tipperary in the final. Mannion subsequently missed Galway's 0-29 to 1-17 defeat of Wexford in the Leinster final because of an ankle injury. He was back on the starting fifteen for the All-Ireland final against Waterford on 3 September. Mannion scored two points from left corner-forward in the 0-26 to 2-17 victory in what was Galway's first All-Ireland Championship in 29 years. He ended the season by being receiving a second All-Star nomination.

On 1 July 2018, Mannion scored three points for Galway in their 0-18 apiece draw with Kilkenny in the Leinster final. The replay a week later saw him win his first Leinster Championship medal on the field of play after Galway retained the title with a 1-28 to 3-15 victory. On 19 August, Mannion was at left corner-forward when Galway faced Limerick in the All-Ireland final. He was held scoreless throughout the 3-16 to 2-18 defeat. Mannion ended the season by being nominated for a third All-Star award.

Career statistics

Honours

Player
Galway
All-Ireland Senior Hurling Championship (1): 2017 
Leinster Senior Hurling Championship (2): 2017, 2018
National Hurling League (2): 2017, 2021

Individual
Awards
GAA GPA All Stars Awards (1): 2015

References

1994 births
Living people
Ahascragh-Fohenagh hurlers
All-Ireland Senior Hurling Championship winners
Alumni of the University of Galway
Caltra Gaelic footballers
Connacht inter-provincial hurlers
Dual players
Galway inter-county hurlers
University of Galway hurlers